A circular prime is a prime number with the property that the number generated at each intermediate step when cyclically permuting its (base 10) digits will be prime. For example, 1193 is a circular prime, since 1931, 9311 and 3119 all are also prime. A circular prime with at least two digits can only consist of combinations of the digits 1, 3, 7 or 9, because having 0, 2, 4, 6 or 8 as the last digit makes the number divisible by 2, and having 0 or 5 as the last digit makes it divisible by 5. The complete listing of the smallest representative prime from all known cycles of circular primes (The single-digit primes and repunits are the only members of their respective cycles) is 2, 3, 5, 7, R2, 13, 17, 37, 79, 113, 197, 199, 337, 1193, 3779, 11939, 19937, 193939, 199933, R19, R23, R317, R1031, R49081, R86453, R109297, R270343, R5794777 and R8177207, where Rn is a repunit prime with n digits. There are no other circular primes up to 1023. A type of prime related to the circular primes are the permutable primes, which are a subset of the circular primes (every permutable prime is also a circular prime, but not necessarily vice versa).

Other bases 
The complete listing of the smallest representative prime from all known cycles of circular primes in base 12 is (using inverted two and three for ten and eleven, respectively)
2, 3, 5, 7, Ɛ, R2, 15, 57, 5Ɛ, R3, 117, 11Ɛ, 175, 1Ɛ7, 157Ɛ, 555Ɛ, R5, 115Ɛ77, R17, R81, R91, R225, R255, R4ᘔ5, R5777, R879Ɛ, R198Ɛ1, R23175, and R311407.

where Rn is a repunit prime in base 12 with n digits. There are no other circular primes in base 12 up to 1212.

In base 2, only Mersenne primes can be circular primes, since any 0 permuted to the one's place results in an even number.

References

External links 
 Circular prime at The Prime Glossary
 Circular prime at World of Numbers
  a related sequence (the circular primes are a subsequence of this one)
 Circular, Permutable, Truncatable and Deletable Primes

Base-dependent integer sequences
Classes of prime numbers